The Kingdom of Serbia, or the Serbian Kingdom, was a medieval Serbian state that existed from 1217 to 1346 and was ruled by the Nemanjić dynasty. The Grand Principality of Serbia was elevated with the regal coronation of Stefan Nemanjić as king, after the reunification of Serbian lands. In 1219, Serbian Orthodox Church was reorganized as an autocephalous archbishopric, headed by Saint Sava. The kingdom was proclaimed an empire in 1346, but kingship was not abolished as an institution, since the title of a king was used as an official designation for a co-ruler of the emperor.

Background

The regal coronation of Stefan Nemanjić in 1217 was not a novelty in Serbian history, since there had already been a long tradition of kingship among previous Serbian rulers, centered in Duklja (11th century). During the Nemanjić era, the previous Serbian kingdom in Duklja was referred to as the "Old Kingdom of our forefathers" and such views were also reflected in the royal titles of Stefan Nemanjić and his successors, who styled themselves as kings of all Serbian Lands, including Duklja. Realizing the importance of royal heritage, grand prince Stefan Nemanja (1166-1196), father of Stefan Nemanjić, granted his elder son Vukan Nemanjić rule in Duklja, with the title of king.

By that time, the "Old Kingdom" of Duklja and its former rulers from the Vojislavljević dynasty (kings Mihajlo and Constantine Bodin) were regarded as royal predecessors to the Nemanjić dynasty, that branched from the previous Vukanović dynasty in Raška. Older relations between the two dynasties (Vojislavljević / Vukanović) and the two regions (Duklja / Raška) were very close. In 1083, king Constantine Bodin of Duklja appointed his nephews Vukan and Marko vassals in Raška, one of the inner provinces of his realm. Each province had its own nobility and institutions, and each acquired a member or relative of the Vojislavljević dynasty to govern as župan. Between 1089 and 1091, the Byzantine Empire launched a campaign on Duklja. An internal war broke out in the realm among Bodin's relatives, greatly weakening Duklja. Vukan of Raška took the opportunity to assert himself and broke away, claiming the title of Grand Prince of Serbia.

Up to the end of the 11th century, Duklja had been the center of the Serbian realm, as well as the main state resisting Byzantium. From that time, Raška became the most powerful of the Serbian states, under the rule of the Vukanović dynasty, and it remained so throughout the entire 12th century. Raška also replaced Duklja as the main opponent of the Byzantine Empire. Bodin's heirs were forced to recognize Byzantine overlordship, and now held only the small territories of Duklja and Travunia. During the reign of Vukan's successors, the Byzantines sought to conquer Raška on several occasions, but through resistance, and diplomatic ties with Hungary, that Serbian principality kept its independence. By the time when Stefan Nemanja became the grand župan of Raška (c. 1166), old Duklja was half conquered by the Byzantines reduced to a small principality. Soon after 1180, Stefan Nemanja liberated Duklja thus reuniting Serbian lands, and invested his son Vukan with rule over Duklja with the traditional title of the king. Since Nemanja's second son Stefan became grand župan in 1196, rivalry occurred among brothers, culminating in 1202 when Stefan was overthrown.

History

Reign of Stefan the First-Crowned

In 1204, Stefan Nemanjić regained his rule in Raška and made peace with his brother Vukan of Duklja, who died in 1208. The actual peacemaker was their youngest brother Rastko, former prince of Zahumlje who renounced his rule to become a monk, and took the name Sava, turning all his efforts to spreading Eastern Orthodoxy among his people. Since the Roman Catholic Church already had ambitions to spread its influence to Southeastern Europe as well, Stefan used these circumstances to eventually obtain the recognition of kingship from the Pope, thereby becoming Serbian king in 1217. In Byzantium, Sava managed to secure autocephaly (independence) for the Serbian Church and became the first Serbian archbishop in 1219. In the same year Sava published the first constitution in Serbia — St. Sava's Nomocanon. The Nomocanon was a compilation of Civil law, based on Roman Law, and Canon law, based on Ecumenical Councils. Its basic purpose was to organize the functions of the young Serbian kingdom and the Serbian church. Thus the Serbs acquired both political and religious independence. In 1220, grand assembly of the realm was held in Žiča, were Stefan was crowned by the Orthodox ritual and coronation was performed by archbishop Sava. That act served as a precedent for all their successors: all Serbian kings of the Nemanjić dynasty were crowned in Žiča, by Serbian archbishops.

Reign of Radoslav, Vladislav, Uroš I and Dragutin

The next generation of Serbian rulers — the sons of Stefan Prvovenčani, Radoslav, Vladislav, and Uroš I — marked a period of stagnation of the state structure. All three kings were more or less dependent on some of the neighbouring states — Byzantium, Bulgaria, or Hungary. The ties with the Hungarians played a decisive role as Uroš I was succeeded by his son Dragutin, whose wife was a Hungarian princess. Later, when Dragutin abdicated in favour of his younger brother Milutin, in 1282, the Hungarian king Ladislaus IV gave him lands in northeastern Bosnia, the region of Mačva, and the city of Belgrade, whilst he managed to conquer and annex lands in northeastern Serbia. Thus, some of these territories became part of the Serbian state for the first time. His new state was named Kingdom of Srem. In that time the name Srem was a designation for two territories: Upper Srem (present day Srem) and Lower Srem (present day Mačva). The Kingdom of Srem under the rule of Stefan Dragutin was actually Lower Srem, but some historical sources mention that Stefan Dragutin also ruled over Upper Srem and Slavonia. After Dragutin died in 1316, his son, king Vladislav II, became king and ruled until 1325.

Reign of Milutin

Under Dragutin's younger brother, King Milutin, Serbia grew stronger despite having to occasionally fight wars on three different fronts. King Milutin was an apt diplomat much inclined to the use of a customary medieval diplomatic and dynastic marriages. He was married five times, with Hungarian, Bulgarian, and Byzantine princesses. He is also famous for building churches, some of which are the finest examples of Medieval Serbian architecture, including the Gračanica monastery in Kosovo, the Cathedral in Hilandar monastery on Mount Athos, and the St. Archangel Church in Jerusalem. Because of his endowments, King Milutin has been proclaimed a saint, in spite of his tumultuous life. He was succeeded on the throne by his son Stefan, later dubbed Stefan Dečanski.

Milutin restored central royal authority in Serbia. After getting into power, he started lengthy attacks on Byzantine Macedonia, winning significant territorial gains, including the city of Skopje, move that had important results. The strategically important region of Macedonia was disputed for long between Byzantines, Bulgarians and Serbs. The expansion into the area marked the start of Serbian dominance in the Balkans. By this, Serbian policy shifted from its original north-western Adriatic-Danubian focus, into Byzantine-centered south-central Balkans. By acquiring Skopje, Milutin's kingdom possessed a strategically located, well-fortified city that could serve as capital to a territorially extensive state. Its central geo-strategical position on the important Vardar-Morava commercial route made it a natural new political, economical and cultural center. Skopje's benefits, combined with Serbia's flourishing mining and trade resources, guaranteed Milutin a status as a major player in Balkan affairs.

Although the major events were happening in the South, Milutin also devoted attention in Serbian affairs in the North. With his deposed brother Dragutin governing the Belgrade region, the two brothers acted in concert as military allies, Dragutin helping Milutin in the South and vice versa. By early 1290s Serbia expanded towards the vicinity of Vidin. Threatened by Serbian expansion, Shishman of Vidin failed to repel the brothers forces, and accepted Serbian suzerainty.

In the South, Milutin obtained territorial gains in Macedonia and Northern Albania from Byzantine emperor Andronikos II Palaiologos. With Andronikos suffering from both internal and external pressures, he sought peace with Milutin, and a treaty was sealed in 1299. As result, Milutin kept all conquered territories, Skopje became kingdoms capital, and he married Byzantine princess Simonis (Simonida), with the wedding taking place in Thessaloniki, that same year. Simonis, aged 5 at time, was kept in the royal nursery for some years before her husband consummated the marriage. Simonis brought a large entourage to Serbia, and with her arrival Serbia received a massive injection of Byzantine culture. Byzantine-style court ceremonials and dress were adopted, Byzantine functional and honorary titles appeared, court offices were renamed, and Byzantine administrative, fiscal and legal institutions were copied. Byzantinization was further expanded by Serbia's newly won populous Greek-speaking regions, in which Milutin retained all former Byzantine political, social and cultural activities.

The final two decades of Milutin reign were marked by civil strife with his brother Dragutin and the regional nobles, and with territorial losses to Hungarians in the north. Milutin also faced problems with his illegitimate son Stefan Dečanski, who was unhappy with his fathers favouritism towards his legitimate younger brother Konstantin. When Milutin died without leaving a testament, civil war erupted between Dečanski, Konstantin and their cousin Vladislav II. Dečanski ended up victorious, and was crowned as Stefan Uroš III Dečanski.

Reign of Stefan Dečanski

Stefan Dečanski spread the kingdom to the east by winning the town of Nis and surrounding counties, and to the south by acquiring territories in Macedonia, He built the Visoki Dečani monastery in Metohija, the most monumental example of Serbian Medieval architecture, earning him his moniker. Stefan Dečanski defeated the Bulgarians in Battle of Velbazhd in 1330.

However, it started not so well. During the civil war after Milutin's death, Serbia lost Zachlumia and Vidin. Zachlumia felt under Bosnian control, while the Despotate of Vidin, under Mihail Shishman, got to set free from Serbian suzerainty and returned to that of Bulgaria. Shishman would become Bulgarian tsar in 1323. On the other side, Byzantium was not doing well hard-pressed withstanding periodic Serbian and Bulgarian raids. Civil war erupted in which Bulgarians supported young Andronikos, and Serbs the elder Andronikos side. Despite younger Andronikos win within Byzantine internal struggle for power, by the time Byzantine civil war ended Serbia was the dominant Balkan power. Despite having supported the losing side, Serbia had managed to expand itself into Macedonia, which was the bone of contention between the three sides. As result, Byzantines and Bulgarians viewed Dečanski as a threat, and forged an anti-Serbian treaty which took action in 1330 when both launched an offensive against Serbia. Andronikos attacked Serbian-held parts of Macedonia, while Bulgarians met in a decisive battle near Kyustendil (Velbuzhd) in eastern Macedonia. The Bulgarian army was destroyed in that battle, and Mihail Shishman, Bulgarian Tsar, fatally wounded. When Andronikos heard the news, he quickly withdrew.

The Battle of Velbazhd had enormous consequences. After the defeat, Bulgaria lay militarily crippled and politically subordinated to Serbia's interests. Sources diverge whether all of Bulgaria, or some parts, or technically officially not, Bulgaria became a vassal of Serbia, but Bulgaria's new tsar, Ivan Alexander, in this new reality, had his ability to conduct independent Bulgarian policies somehow limited.

Dečanski then launched a war of total Macedonian conquest in 1331. Andronikos tied to negotiate peace in 1334, however Byzantines slipped into another civil war, leaving open way for Serbia to gain more power and territory and consolidate its hegemonic position in the Balkans. Serb nobles were eager to deliver a final strike to the Byzantines, but Dečanski decided otherwise. His son, Stefan Dušan took advantage of this alienation of Serb nobility, and lead a coup that deposed his father.

Serbian Empire 

Stefan Dečanski was overthrown in 1331 by his son, Stefan Dušan. Taking advantage of the Byzantine civil war of 1341–1347, Dušan doubled the size of his kingdom, seizing territories to the south, southeast, and east at the expense of the Byzantine Empire. He conquered almost the entire territory of present-day Greece, except for the Peloponnese and the islands. After he conquered the city of Serres, he was crowned the Emperor of Serbs and Greeks in Skoplje (former Bulgarian capital) by the Serbian Patriarch, on April 16, 1346. These actions, which the Byzantines received with indignation, appear to have been supported by the Bulgarian Empire and tsar Ivan Alexander, as the Patriarch of Bulgaria Simeon had participated in both the creation of a Serbian Patriarchate of Peć and the imperial coronation of Stefan Uroš IV Dušan. Dushan made marriage alliance with Bulgarian tsar Ivan Alexander, marrying his sister Helena, freeing himself from its concerns over the eastern bordering. The goal of Stefan Dushan was to become the successor of the Byzantine Emperors, and he tried to organize a Crusade with the Pope against the threatening Turks. He then turned to the South and pushed the borders towards Thessaloniki where he was stopped by the cities strong walls. Dušan accepted Andronikos peace offer in 1334, however, when Andronikos died, in 1341, there was a renewed civil war in Byzantium. One of the sides, John VI Kantakouzenos, appealed to Dušan for help, and was granted asylum in Serbia. However, when the governor of Thessaly, who also controlled South Epirus, recognised Kantakouzenos as emperor, Dušan ceased its support and switched sides. This is when Kantakouzenos turns towards Seljuk Turks for help and Turks for first time entered European soil.

The Imperial constitution, Dušan's Code, was enacted in 1349 and amended in 1354. The Code was based on Roman-Byzantine law. The legal transplanting is notable within articles 171 and 172 of Dušan's Code, which regulated the juridical independence. They were taken from the Byzantine code Basilika (book VII, 1, 16-17). Dušan opened new trade routes and strengthened the  economy of the state. Serbia flourished, becoming one of the most developed countries and cultures in Europe, with a high political, economic, and cultural reputation.

Dušan died suddenly in December 1355 at age 47.

Monarchs

See also

Serbia in the Middle Ages
Serbian Orthodox Church
Serbian culture
Greek-Serbian relations

References

Sources

 
 
 
 
 
 
 
 
 
 
 
 
 
 
 
 
 
 
 
 
 
 
 
 
 
 
 
 
 
 
 
 
 
 
 
 
 
 
 
 
 
 
 
 
 
 
 
 
 
 
 
 
 
 

 
13th century in Serbia
14th century in Serbia
Medieval Serbia
Medieval Montenegro
Medieval Macedonia
1217 establishments in Europe
1346 disestablishments in Europe
Former kingdoms